Bev Barnes (9 August 1951 – 16 August 2016) was a Canadian basketball player. She competed in the women's tournament at the 1976 Summer Olympics.

References

1951 births
2016 deaths
Canadian women's basketball players
Olympic basketball players of Canada
Basketball players at the 1976 Summer Olympics
Basketball players from Ottawa
UBC Thunderbirds basketball players